Aphelenchidae is a family of nematodes belonging to the order Aphelenchida.

Genera

Genera:
 Aphelenchus Bastian, 1865
 Bursaphelenchus Fuchs, 1937
 Cryptophelenchus

References

Secernentea
Nematode families